Petworth is a residential neighborhood in the Northwest quadrant of Washington, D.C. It is bounded to the east by the Armed Forces Retirement Home and Rock Creek Cemetery, to the west by Arkansas Avenue NW, to the south by Rock Creek Church Road NW and Spring Road NW, and to the north by Kennedy Street NW.

The neighborhood is primarily residential with a mix of terraced houses and single-family homes. It is accessible via the Georgia Avenue–Petworth station on the Green Line and Yellow Line of the Washington Metro. Petworth borders to two expanses of historic green space, Rock Creek Cemetery and President Lincoln's Cottage at the Soldiers' Home.

Politics
Petworth is represented on the Council of the District of Columbia by the Ward 4 council member, a position held since 2021 by Janeese Lewis George. Muriel Bowser served as Ward 4 councilmember until she became the city's mayor on January 2, 2015. She was succeeded by Brandon Todd.

History

Petworth was the name of the 205-acre country estate of John Tayloe III, likely named for the ancient town of Petworth in West Sussex, England. The estate, located at the northeast corner of 7th Street Pike (later known as Brightwood Avenue, now Georgia Avenue) and Rock Creek Church Road, was bequeathed to his son Benjamin Ogle Tayloe. In 1887, it was sold by Tayloe's heirs to developers for $107,000. In 1889, developers registered “Petworth” with the District surveyor as a 387-acre plat of subdivision containing the former Tayloe estate and the Marshal Brown estate. In 1893, additional real estate deals formed "West Petworth," from land west of Brightwood Avenue, including the Ruppert Farm, which was sold for $142,680, the 20-acre Burnaby tract, and a 14-acre property known as Poor Tom’s Last Shaft. In 1900, Henry J. Ruppert sold an additional 31.7 acres west of Brightwood and Iowa Avenues and south of Utica Street (now Allison Street) to the District for a proposed municipal hospital.

In the early 1900s, the expansion of a streetcar line along Georgia Avenue to the border of Silver Spring, Maryland, made Petworth more accessible.

Many of the thousands of similar brick row houses in the neighborhood were constructed by Morris Cafritz and by D.J. Dunigan Company in the 1920s–1930s. Dunigan donated the land that became the site for St. Gabriel's Church and School next to Grant Circle.

Demographics

Community events
 Upshur Street Art and Craft Fair
 Petworth Community Market, a farmer's market, is held along 9th Street between Upshur and Taylor Streets weekly on Saturdays from May through October.
 Petworth Jazz Project is a free music series of jazz performances held at Petworth Park at 8th and Taylor Streets from May through September.
 Celebrate Petworth, a street fair.
 From 1993 to 2011, the DC Caribbean Carnival parade was held annual each June along Georgia Avenue, passing through Petworth en route to Howard University.

Education

Libraries

Petworth Neighborhood Library
The -story Georgian Revival Petworth Neighborhood Library building opened in 1939 at the corner of Georgia Ave. NW, Kansas Ave. NW, and Upshur St. NW. In addition to providing access to DC Public Library general circulation items, the library’s collection includes a Spanish Language collection, job and employment literature, and Adult Basic Education materials. In June 2009, the library underwent a two-part renovation and re-opened on February 28, 2011.

Public schools

Petworth is served by District of Columbia Public Schools (DCPS).

Theodore Roosevelt Senior High School
Roosevelt Senior High School enrolls students in ninth through 12th grade. The high school is also home to Roosevelt S.T.A.Y. program, an alternative academic and career/technical program that will lead to a high school diploma or vocational certificate. The high school, located at 13th and Upshur streets NW, was built in 1932 to accommodate 1,200 students. In 2013–15, it underwent a $121 million renovation, during which classes were held at the nearby MacFarland Middle School campus on 13th Street NW. The school reopened for the 2015–16 academic year.

During the renovation, The American Panorama, a 1934 New Deal–funded fresco by the Baltimore-born artist Nelson Rosenberg, was uncovered in the school cafeteria in fall 2013. The fresco was restored as part of the renovation.

Truesdell Education Campus 
Truesdell Education Campus enrolls 480 students (2013–2014) in grades pre-kindergarten through eighth grade.

Powell Elementary School 
Powell enrolls students in pre-kindergarten through fifth grade. The school opened in 1929 as a two-story brick building on Upshur St. NW near 14th St. NW, and was expanded in 1959 with a second structure. In 2016, the school underwent a $44.7 million modernization and expansion.

On March 4, 2014, President Barack Obama visited the school, where he announced the fiscal year 2015 budget and spoke about Powell's early childhood education program. "We know—and this is part of the reason why we're here today—that education has to start at the earliest possible ages," Obama said. "So this budget expands access to the kind of high-quality preschool and other early learning programs to give all of our children the same kinds of opportunities that those wonderful children that we just saw are getting right here at Powell."

Charter schools 
 Breakthrough Montessori Public Charter School
 Bridges Public Charter School
 Center City Public Charter School – Petworth Campus
 E.L. Haynes Public Charter School
 Washington Latin Public Charter School

Local businesses
In the 2000s, Petworth experienced growth in its commercial corridor. There are restaurants and bars in the neighborhood though several restaurants on Upshur Street closed in late 2018.

Public art
 "The American Panorama," 1934, by Nelson Rosenberg. Fresco. Originally located in the cafeteria at Roosevelt Senior High School, uncovered during a renovation in 2013, and now on display in the high school’s main lobby.
 "(Here I Stand) In the Spirit of Paul Robeson," 2001, by Allen Uzikee Nelson. Sculpture. Located at the corner of Georgia and Kansas Avenues NW.
 "Homage to a Community," 2002, by Andrew Reid and Carlos Alves. Mural and ceramic tile frieze. Located inside the metro station.
 "New Leaf," 2007, by Lisa Scheer. Sculpture. Located outside the metro station at Georgia and New Hampshire Avenues.
 Chuck Brown mural, 2012 (Destroyed in 2020), by MacFarland Middle School students led by art teacher Charles Jean-Pierre. Mural. Formerly located on the exterior of 3701 New Hampshire Ave NW
 Untitled Ramones mural, 2018. Located on the 2nd Street NW wall of Slash Run, 201 Upshur Street NW.
 "SHOWOFF," 2013, by Cita Sadeli (Also known as Chelove). Mural. Located on the southwest corner of Taylor Street NW and Georgia Avenue NW.
 Petworth mural, 2015, by Juan Pineda. Mural Located in the alley on the 800 block of Upshur Street NW between Willow and Petworth Citizen.  
 Senhora dos Tempos or "Goddess of Time," 2016, by Robezio Marqs and Tereza Dequinta (known as the "Acidum Project"). Mural Located at Kansas Avenue and Taylor Street NW.

Historic places

Adams Memorial by Augustus Saint-Gaudens (Titled: "The Peace of God." Also known as "Grief"), Rock Creek Cemetery, Webster Street and Rock Creek Church Road, NW
Listed on the District Of Columbia Inventory Of Historic Sites, November 8, 1964
Listed on the National Register of Historic Places, March 16, 1972
Billy Simpson's House of Seafood and Steaks, 3815 Georgia Avenue, NW
Listed on the District Of Columbia Inventory Of Historic Sites, September 25, 2008
Listed on the National Register of Historic Places, March 17, 2009
Engine Company 24, 3670 New Hampshire Avenue, NW (originally 3702 Georgia Avenue, NW)
Listed on the District Of Columbia Inventory Of Historic Sites, March 17, 1993
Lincoln Cottage (President Lincoln's Cottage at the Soldiers' Home) (Formerly, Corn Rigs, Anderson House), Soldiers' Home Grounds, Rock Creek Church Road and Upshur Street, NW
Listed on the District Of Columbia Inventory Of Historic Sites, November 8, 1964
National Monument designation July 7, 2000
Petworth Gardens (Also known as Webster Garden Apartments), 124, 126, 128, and 130 Webster St., NW
Listed on the District Of Columbia Inventory Of Historic Sites, September 25, 2008
Listed on the National Register of Historic Places, November 2008
Rock Creek Cemetery, Webster Street and Rock Creek Church Road, NW
Listed on the District Of Columbia Inventory Of Historic Sites, January 21, 1977
Listed on the National Register of Historic Places, August 12, 1977
St. Paul's Church (Rock Creek Parish), Rock Creek Church Road & Webster Street, NW
Listed on the District Of Columbia Inventory Of Historic Sites, November 8, 1964
Listed on the National Register of Historic Places, March 16, 1972
Soldiers’ Home National Historic Site (United States Military Asylum), Rock Creek Church Road & Upshur Street, NW
National Historic Landmark designation, November 7, 1973
Listed on the National Register of Historic Places, February 11, 1974
Listed on the District Of Columbia Inventory Of Historic Sites, March 3, 1979

Notable people from Petworth
Notable people from Petworth include:
 Blelvis (Rondy Wooten), a street entertainer known for his covers of Elvis Presley songs
 David Grosso, politician
 Christina Henderson, a politician
 Robert A. Levy, chairman of the Cato Institute
 Paperhaus, a band
 Michael Steele, conservative political commentator
 Martha Tabor, educator, laborer, union organizer, photographer, and  artist

References

External links 

 Petworth News blog – local news about the neighborhood
 Prince of Petworth blog
 Petworth is Like Omaha – historical post about the area
 Why Is It Named Petworth?
 Here Is Everything You Should Know About Petworth, According to Resident/Blogger Drew Schneider
 History sits quietly on a hilltop in D.C.'s Petworth area
Maps of Petworth Development from 1903 to 1919

 
1887 establishments in Washington, D.C.